The Baltimore Bullets were a professional basketball team based in Baltimore. The Bullets competed in the American Basketball League (1944–1947), the Basketball Association of America (1947–1949), and (following the BAA's absorption of the National Basketball League) the National Basketball Association (1949–1954). On November 27, 1954, the team folded with a 3–11 record on the season, making the Bullets the last NBA franchise to fold. Out of all defunct NBA teams, the Bullets were members of the association for the longest time and the only defunct team to win a championship.

The Bullets name was revived in 1963, when the former Chicago Zephyrs relocated to Baltimore; even after these Bullets relocated to Washington in 1973, they kept their name for 24 more years until they were renamed to the Wizards.

Franchise history

ABL (1944–1947)
The Baltimore Bullets began play in 1944 as an American Basketball Association (ABL) team. The Bullets acquired their name in reference to the Phoenix Shot Tower. In the ABL, Baltimore reached the championship round all three seasons, winning the ABL title in 1946. The Bullets won a division title in 1947, but forfeited that season's championship in favor of playing in the World Professional Basketball Tournament (the Bullets' second appearance in the tournament).

BAA/NBA (1947–1954)
The Bullets moved to the Basketball Association of America (BAA) in 1947, and won the 1948 championship over the Philadelphia Warriors (now Golden State Warriors). In 1949, the BAA absorbed the National Basketball League (NBL), and became the National Basketball Association (NBA). The Bullets struggled on the court after their championship season, and never posted another winning record. In 1954, Ray Felix won the NBA Rookie of the Year Award and became the second African-American to be named an All-Star. Felix was traded to the Knicks on September 17, 1954, and on November 27, the Bullets became the last NBA franchise to fold.

Season-by-season records

Notes

List of notable personnel

Players

Coaches
Ben Kramer
Red Rosan
Buddy Jeannette
Walt Budko
Fred Scolari
Chick Reiser
Clair Bee
Albert Barthelme

Basketball Hall of Fame members

Notes:
 1 He also coached the team in 1947–1951

Draft

References

 
Basketball Association of America teams
American Basketball League (1925–1955) teams
1944 establishments in Maryland
1954 disestablishments in Maryland
Basketball teams established in 1944
Basketball teams disestablished in 1954
Defunct National Basketball Association teams